Lawrence Michael Hanks (born January 26, 1953) is an American entomologist and Professor in the Department of Entomology at the University of Illinois at Urbana-Champaign.

Education and career
Hanks received his B.S. from the University of California, Davis in 1978, his M.S. from the University of Nevada, Reno in 1982, and his Ph.D. from the University of Maryland, College Park in 1991. His Ph.D. supervisor was Robert Denno. As a graduate student, he became curious as to why trees in woodland settings were almost free of a pest that was infecting numerous trees in urban landscapes. He subsequently published a study on the subject with Clifford Sadof of Purdue University, which indicated that woodlands contained natural organisms that preyed on the tree pests. He completed his post doctorate at the University of California, Riverside, where he studied ways to combat the effects of a pest borer beetle on eucalyptus trees. He joined the University of Illinois at Urbana-Champaign's faculty in 1996 as an assistant professor, and became an associate professor there in 2003 and a full professor in 2008.

Personal life
He is the eldest brother of actors Tom Hanks and Jim Hanks.

References

External links

 

Tom Hanks
Living people
1953 births
American entomologists
University of California, Davis alumni
University of California, Riverside alumni
University of Illinois Urbana-Champaign faculty
University of Maryland, College Park alumni
University of Nevada, Reno alumni